Upton House may refer to:

Buildings

United Kingdom
 Upton House, Warwickshire, a country house built c.1695, in the care of the National Trust
 Upton House, Dorset, a country house built in 1816
 Upton House, Newham, a building in the London borough of Newham, birthplace of the surgeon Joseph Lister
 Ham House (Newham), London, known as Upton House until the late 1780s

United States
 George B. Upton House, Wickenburg, Arizona, listed on the National Register of Historic Places (NRHP) in Maricopa County, Arizona
 Upton (Baltimore, Maryland), a house listed on the NRHP
 Blanchard-Upton House, Andover, Massachusetts, NRHP-listed
 William Upton House, Sterling Heights, Michigan, also known as Upton House, NRHP-listed
 Harriet Taylor Upton House, Warren, Ohio, NRHP-listed

See also
 Clark Monroe's Uptown House, Harlem, New York NY was a jazz club and bar, one of the Cradles of Bebop
 Upton Apartments, Ogden, Utah, US, listed on the NRHP in Weber County, Utah
 Upton (disambiguation)
 Upton Park (disambiguation)